Anodonthyla emilei is a species of frog in the family Microhylidae. It is endemic to Madagascar. Discovered in Ranomafana National Park in Madagascar in 2003, it has the most divergent call of all Anodonthyla species.

Etymology
A. emilei was named after Emile Rajeriarison, a nature guide at Ranomafana National Park.

References

emilei
Frogs of Africa
Endemic frogs of Madagascar
Amphibians described in 2010
Taxa named by Frank Glaw
Taxa named by Miguel Vences